The Jwaneng diamond mine is the richest diamond mine in the world and is located in south-central Botswana about  west of the city of Gaborone, in the Naledi river valley of the Kalahari. Jwaneng, meaning "a place of small stones", is owned by Debswana, a partnership between the De Beers company and the government of Botswana. It is the second newest of four mines operated by the company, having begun operations in 1982.

Jwaneng is an open pit mine. The mine produces 9.3 million tons per year of ore and an additional 37 million tons per year of waste rock. The mine is located on three kimberlite pipes that converge near the surface, covering 520,000 square metres at ground level. Currently, the mine produces approximately 11 million carats (2,200 kg) of diamonds. The recoverable ore grade at the mine is about 1.25 carats per ton (250 mg/t). , known reserves will allow production at current levels to continue for 27 years. The high rate of diamond extraction, combined with high quality diamonds fetching excellent per weight prices, make the Jwaneng diamond mine the richest diamond mine in the world by value of recovered diamonds.

Jwaneng employs over 2,100 people. The mine also owns and operates a local hospital and Jwaneng Airport. The mine maintains an ISO 14001 certificate for environmental compliance, being the first mine in Botswana to achieve this certification in 2000. Jwaneng is known for its excellent safety record, winning multiple national and international safety awards.

The Enhanced Thematic Mapper Plus (ETM+) instrument on NASA’s Landsat 7 satellite acquired this image of the Jwaneng Diamond Mine on May 17, 2001. The arid, flat landscape that fills most of this image appears in varying shades of brown, crisscrossed by pale beige roads. The Jwaneng Diamond Mine appears in the upper left quadrant of the picture, and a residential area appears near the bottom center.

At the center of the diamond mine, a series of concentric circles cut deeper and deeper into the ground. Surrounding the pit is a network of roads and structures related to the mining operation.

The settlement southeast of the mine contrasts with the arid landscape as much as the mine does. Here, tiny dots of green hint at trees and grassy parks. The pale beige rectangles around the perimeter of this image are probably crops or fallow fields.

The Jwaneng mining lease includes the Jwana Game Park, which includes a field unit of Cheetah Conservation Botswana. The game park is also host to the globally threatened lappet-faced vulture.

References

 Debswana Jwanneng operations. Primary source for article. (Accessed 1/28/11)

Diamond mines in Botswana
Diatremes of Botswana
Open-pit mines
Pre-Holocene volcanoes
Surface mines in Botswana